{{Infobox person
| name               = Olly Mann
| image              = Olly Mann (8046683690).jpg
| caption            = Mann in 2012
| birth_date         = 
| birth_place        = Hendon, North London, England
| death_date         = 
| death_place        = 
| nationality        = British
| education          = St Christopher School, LetchworthSt Catherine's College, Oxford
| occupation         = Broadcaster, journalist
| years_active       = 2006–present
| children           = 2
| birthname          = Oliver Louis Mann
| spouse             = 
| domestic_partner   = 
| credits            = Presenter:Answer Me This!LBCBBC 5 LiveChips with EverythingThe Modern MannRegular Contributor: LorraineBBC BreakfastReporter:Steve Wright in the AfternoonBFBSColumnist: Reader's Digest
}}Oliver Louis Mann' is a British writer, presenter and gadget correspondent. He is best known as the presenter of the weekend evening show on LBC and for his work with longtime collaborator Helen Zaltzman with whom he presented the award-winning podcast Answer Me This!.

Education
Mann was educated at St Christopher School, an independent school in the town of Letchworth Garden City in Hertfordshire, followed by St Catherine's College at the University of Oxford, where he first met Zaltzman.

Life and career

Answer Me This!

Zaltzman and Mann began presenting their weekly comedy podcast Answer Me This! in 2007, recording each episode from Zaltzman's sitting room in Crystal Palace, London.Find Your Dream Job "Top Tip To Being Successful: Try Something New" 2012

The show increased its audience following a number of publicity stunts in Luxembourg, which they had selected as "the world's smallest country with its own iTunes site", and where they became the fourth highest-ranked podcast in the country. In 2009 was nominated for Best Internet Programme at the Sony Radio Academy Awards; an award it went on to win in 2010 (Silver) and 2011 (Gold). It has been selected as one of the Top 10 Comedy Podcasts in the World by The Guardian, and as Critic's Choice in Radio Times, Metro, and The Observer.

In 2010, Zaltzman and Mann wrote a book of the show, published by Faber and Faber, and were commissioned by VisitBritain to make an online video series, "Helen and Olly's Great British Questions". In 2012, they released their first album, Answer Me This! Jubilee, which entered the UK Top 20 Album Chart.

 The Modern Mann 
The Modern Mann podcast launched in 2015 as a "magazine show for the podcast generation". In each episode, Olly Mann is joined by sex educator and journalist Alix Fox for a weekly trip into Alix's "Foxhole", and tech writer and T.V presenter Ollie Peart for "The Zeitgeist".

The show starts with "The Zeitgeist" where Peart is set weekly challenges listeners submit, which he then reports back on. In the middle segment, Mann interviews people whose job it is to "provoke or confuse". Examples include a theme park designer, a white hat hacker, and a gambling addict. The show finishes with The Foxhole featuring Alix Fox, a "softly-spoken, foul-mouthed love expert" who answers listeners' questions such as "How do I clean my vibrator?" and "How do I tell my wife I’m gay?"

The show has twice been nominated 'Podcast of the Year' at the UK Radio Academy Awards, winning Silver in 2016.

Radio
In 2009, Zaltzman and Mann became the UK's first podcasters to be given their own radio show, "Web 2009 with Helen and Olly", an irreverent look back at the year's online trends, on BBC 5 Live. This was followed by other specials for the network, including "Web 2010 with Helen and Olly", in which they interviewed Trinny Woodall and Jon Ronson; and, in 2012, "Helen and Olly's Required Listening", a look at the world of alternative broadcasting. In 2010, 5 Live gave Zaltzman and Mann their own regular slot, as the "internet experts" on Saturday night news magazine programme Saturday Edition. After the show had been running for two years, the slot was made available to download as part of the BBC's weekly Let's Talk About Tech podcast.

In 2012, Mann became a regular stand-in presenter on London talk station LBC 97.3, where he has interviewed comedians Rufus Hound and Charlie Higson and hosted the overnight slot for ten nights over the festive period. In December 2013, he was announced as the new presenter of the overnight slot for 2014.

Gadgets & technology
Mann is the gadgets correspondent for British Forces News on BFBS and reports on technology for Radio 2 daytime show Steve Wright in the Afternoon, including annual coverage of the Consumer Electronics Show in Las Vegas. He is also the gadget columnist for Reader's Digest and has reported on gadgets and technology for outlets including This Morning, Sky News, CNET and the Jeremy Vine show.

Television
As a newspaper reviewer, Mann regularly appears on BBC Breakfast, Lorraine, Sky News and the BBC News Channel.

Before going front of camera, Mann worked as a TV producer on shows including The Culture Show (BBC2), and ITV's The London Programme and Confessions.Pull Yourself Together Zine "Helen and Olly Answer Me This!" December 2010 He now writes for comedy shows including Celebrity Juice and Keith's LemonAid''.

References

External links
Answer Me This! podcast
Olly Mann's official site

BBC radio presenters
English male comedians
British podcasters
Living people
1981 births
British Jews